The Shweli I Dam is a gravity dam on the Shweli River about  southwest of Namhkam in Shan State, Burma. The primary purpose of the dam is hydroelectric power generation and it supports a power station. Construction on the dam began in 2002 and the river was diverted on 10 December 2006. On 5 September 2008, the first generator was commissioned and the last of the six was commissioned in April 2009. The dam and power station was constructed under the build–operate–transfer method and cost US$756.2 million. It is owned and operated by the Shweli River-I Power Station Co. The Shweli II and Shweli III Dams are planned downstream.

Gallery

See also

Dams in Burma
 List of power stations in Burma

References

Dams completed in 2008
Dams in Myanmar
Gravity dams
Buildings and structures in Shan State